Përparim is a village and a former municipality in the Elbasan County, central Albania. At the 2015 local government reform it became a subdivision of the municipality Peqin. The population at the 2011 census was 3,423. The municipal unit consists of the villages Galush, Lisnaj, Bicaj, Çaushaj, Përparim, Fatishe, Garunje e Madhë, Arven, Gjevur, Kodras, Lolaj, Katesh, Cobane and Urucaj.

References

Former municipalities in Elbasan County
Administrative units of Peqin
Villages in Elbasan County